Duloe may refer to:
Duloe, Bedfordshire, England
Duloe, Cornwall, England